Meritzer Williams (born 1 January 1989) is a Saint Kitts and Nevis sprinter who specializes in the 200 metres. She was born in Charlestown.

Her personal best times are 11.57 seconds in the 100 metres, achieved in May 2008 in Provo; and 22.96 seconds in the 200 metres, achieved in June 2008 in Basseterre.

Achievements

References

1989 births
Living people
Saint Kitts and Nevis female sprinters
Olympic athletes of Saint Kitts and Nevis
Athletes (track and field) at the 2008 Summer Olympics
Athletes (track and field) at the 2014 Commonwealth Games
Commonwealth Games competitors for Saint Kitts and Nevis
Olympic female sprinters